The O. E. Payne House, also known as Dual Gables, is a historic building located in Chariton, Iowa, United States. The single-story frame house was built in 1889.  Its significance is derived from its unusual architectural form that originated in the picturesque architectural tradition of the mid-19th century.  It follows a Y-shaped plan with two front gables that are set at right angles from each other, and they each sit at a 45° angle to the street.  Within the angle is located two entrances, above which is a wooden frieze that features quatrefoil cutouts.  On the gable ends the clapboards are set in a diagonal pattern above a frieze of recessed square panels.  The stem of the Y extends to the rear of the property.  The house was listed on the National Register of Historic Places in 1979.

References

Houses completed in 1889
Chariton, Iowa
Houses in Lucas County, Iowa
National Register of Historic Places in Lucas County, Iowa
Houses on the National Register of Historic Places in Iowa